The Whittier Fault is a geologic fault located in eastern Los Angeles County in Southern California, that is one of the two upper branches of the Elsinore Fault Zone, with the Chino Fault the second.

Geology
The Whittier Fault is a  right-lateral strike-slip fault that runs along the Chino Hills range between the cities of Chino Hills and Whittier. It is estimated that this fault could generate a quake of 6.0–7.2 on the moment magnitude scale.

See also
 Puente Hills Fault
 San Andreas Fault

References
 

Seismic faults of California
Strike-slip faults
Geology of Los Angeles County, California
Geology of Orange County, California
Geology of Riverside County, California
Geography of the San Gabriel Valley
Chino Hills (California)
Whittier, California